Fullback or Full back may refer to:

Sports
 A position in various kinds of football, including:
 Full-back (association football), in association football (soccer), a defender playing in a wide position
 Fullback (gridiron football), in American and Canadian football (gridiron), a position in the offensive backfield
 Fullback (rugby league), a position behind the main line of backs in rugby league football
 Fullback (rugby union), a position behind the main line of backs in rugby union football
 Fullback, one of the Australian rules football positions
 A similar defence position in (field) hockey

Other uses
 Sukhoi Su-34, a Russian fighter aircraft, from its NATO reporting name
 Fiat Fullback, a pickup truck based on the Mitsubishi L200

See also
Half back (disambiguation)
Three-quarter back